The 2007 Internazionali Femminili di Palermo was a tennis tournament played on outdoor clay courts. It was the 20th edition of the Internazionali Femminili di Palermo, and was part of the WTA Tier IV tournaments of the 2007 WTA Tour. It was held in Palermo, Italy, from 16 to 22 July 2007.

Points and prize money

Point distribution

Prize money

* per team

Singles main draw entrants

Seeds

Other entrants 

The following players received wildcards into the singles main draw:
  Silvia Disderi
  Sara Errani  
  Antonella Serra Zanetti

The following players received entry from the qualifying draw:
  Sorana Cîrstea  
  Andreja Klepač 
  Raluca Olaru
  Klára Zakopalová

The following players received entries as lucky losers:
  Conchita Martínez Granados
  Ekaterina Ivanova
  María José Martínez Sánchez

Doubles main draw entrants

Seeds

Other entrants 
The following pairs received wildcards into the doubles main draw:
  Alice Canepa /  Karin Knapp

Champions

Singles 

 Ágnes Szávay def.  Martina Müller, 6–0, 6–1

Doubles 

 Mariya Koryttseva /  Darya Kustova def.  Alice Canepa /  Karin Knapp, 6–4, 6–1

References

External links 
Doubles and Singles Main Draws

Internazionali Femminili di Palermo
Internazionali Femminili di Palermo
2007 in Italian women's sport
Torneo